The name Gardo may refer to:

 Gardo House, a historic residence in Salt Lake City, Utah, USA
 Gardo Versoza (born 1969), a Filipino actor and comedian
 Typhoon Gardo, a powerful 2018 tropical cyclone
 Qardho, also known as Gardo, a city in Somalia